The women's 500 metres races of the 2015–16 ISU Speed Skating World Cup 5, arranged in the Sørmarka Arena in Stavanger, Norway, were held on 29 and 30 January 2016.

Zhang Hong of China won race one, while compatriot Yu Jing came second, and Jorien ter Mors of the Netherlands came third. Miho Takagi of Japan won the first Division B race.

Yu and Zhang shifted places at the top in race two, while Heather McLean of Canada finished in third place. Li Qishi of China won the second Division B race.

Race 1
Race one took place on Friday, 29 January, with Division B scheduled in the morning session, at 10:30, and Division A scheduled in the afternoon session, at 16:00.

Division A

Division B

Race 2
Race two took place on Saturday, 30 January, with Division B scheduled in the morning session, at 08:45, and Division A scheduled in the afternoon session, at 14:30.

Division A

Division B

References

Women 0500
5